The 1918 TCU Horned Frogs football team represented Texas Christian University (TCU) as a member of the Texas Intercollegiate Athletic Association (TIAA) during the 1918 college football season. Led by Ernest M. Tipton in his first and only year as head coach, the Horned Frogs compiled an overall record of 4–3. The team's captain was Bryan Miller, who played quarterback

Schedule

References

TCU
TCU Horned Frogs football seasons
TCU Horned Frogs football